Hokendauqua Creek is a  tributary of the Lehigh River in Northampton County, Pennsylvania in the United States.

Hokendauqua Creek joins the Lehigh River at Northampton.

See also
List of rivers of Pennsylvania

References

Tributaries of the Lehigh River
Rivers of Pennsylvania
Rivers of Northampton County, Pennsylvania